Claude Moreau (born 19 December 1958) is a French former professional racing cyclist. He rode in two editions of the Tour de France.

References

External links
 

1958 births
Living people
French male cyclists
Sportspeople from Vendée
Cyclists from Pays de la Loire
20th-century French people